Mikhail Zhelobovskiy (born 8 May 1946) is a Belarusian former long-distance runner who competed in the 1968 Summer Olympics.

References

1946 births
Living people
Belarusian male long-distance runners
Olympic athletes of the Soviet Union
Athletes (track and field) at the 1968 Summer Olympics
Universiade medalists in athletics (track and field)
Universiade gold medalists for the Soviet Union
Medalists at the 1973 Summer Universiade
Soviet male long-distance runners